The 780s decade ran from January 1, 780, to December 31, 789.

Significant people
 Al-Mahdi Abbasid caliph
 Al-Hadi Abbasid caliph
 Harun al-Rashid
 Alcuin
 Charlemagne
 Al-Khayzuran
 Zubaidah bint Ja'far

References

Sources